Garnier de Nablus (1147 – 31 August 1192), also known as Garnier of Syria, was the tenth Grand Master of the Knights Hospitaller from 1190 to 1192, succeeding Armengol de Aspa. He fought at the Battle of Arsuf in 1191 during the Third Crusade. It was under his magistracy that the headquarters of the Order were transferred from Tyre to Acre. He was succeeded by Geoffroy de Donjon.

Biography 
The name Garnier de Nablus possibly links him to a well attested family settled in Nablus, but he could also be of English origin because he was Prior of the Langue d'Angleterre, an office normally entrusted to a native of the language. He was Lord of Gibelin from 1173 to 1175, and then grand preceptor of the Order on two occasions, from 1176 to 1177 and from 1180 to 1184. He was then invested, on April 10, 1185, with the functions of Prior of the Langue d'Angleterre until 1189, a function which he combined in 1189 with the office of Grand Commander of the Hospitaller.

Garnier was seriously injured at the disastrous Battle of Hattin in 1187, which decided the fate of Jerusalem. He nevertheless managed to reach the city of Ascalon and recovered from his wounds. He took over from Armengol de Aspa to become Grand Master at an unknown date, but generally considered to be between July 1189 and 25 March 1190. He was in Paris from July 1189 to 24 March 1190 waiting for Richard I of England. He embarked in Marseille in the summer of 1190 for Messina, arriving on 23 September where he met Philippe Auguste who had arrived from Genoa on 16 September. A document dated 8 October 1190 in Messina confirms the presence of the two kings, the Grand Master of the Hospitaller and Robert IV de Sablé, soon to be Grand Master of the Templars.

Third Crusade
Garnier left Messina on 10 April 1191, with Richard's fleet, which then anchored on 1 May at the port of Lemesos . Richard continued to Cyprus on 6 May to avenge the crews of three English ships thrown ashore by the storm that the Emperor of Cyprus Isaac Komnenos had attacked. Richard subdued the island on 11 May despite the mediation of Garnier. They set sail again on 5 June and sank a Muslim ship that was going to supply Acre on 7 June, in sight of Margat, a fortress belonging to the Hospitallers. They arrived in Acre on 8 June to the acclamations of the attackers. There they found Philippe Auguste leading the siege. The besiegers eventually got the upper hand and, under the helpless eyes of Saladin, the besieged capitulated on 12 July 1191.

Philip Augustus left the Holy Land on 31 July 31, 1191. On 22 August 1191, Richard left Acre in the direction of Jaffa. The Templars formed the vanguard, the Breton and Angevin knights the first group, in the second the Poitevins under the orders of Guy de Lusignan, the third the Normans and the English and at the rear, the Hospitallers. The foot soldiers were on the left wing and on the rear, on the right wing the convoy between the troops and the sea. Richard with an elite troop was ready to intervene where necessary. The Hospitallers were attacked on September 7, arriving at the gardens of Arsuf.

Battle of Arsuf

Richard had previously ordered no direct engagement with the enemy on the march to capture Jaffa during the Battle of Arsuf. Situated at the rear of the military column, Garnier's Hospitallers were under heavy pressure by the Muslims. They were constantly harassed with arrows and small scale hit-and-run attacks in an attempt to disrupt and lure the crusader column into full battle. According to the 13th-century manuscript Itinerarium Regis Ricardi, Garnier was near breaking point and rode forward in person to try to persuade Richard to attack:

My lord the king, we are violently pressed by the enemy, and are in danger of eternal infamy, as if we did not dare to return their blows; we are each of us losing our horses one after another, and why should we bear with them any further?

He also asked that Richard relieve the pressure with a cavalry charge. Richard refused and replied, "Good Master, it is you who must sustain the attack; no man can be everywhere at once." When the pressure increased, the Grand Master and one other knight, Baldwin de Carreo, charged the Saracens. They were joined soon after by the rest of the Hospitaller force. Richard, seeing that his orders were already disobeyed, signaled for a full charge. This caught the enemy at a vulnerable moment, and their ranks were broken. Thus, in some ways, Garnier helped win the battle, though in contravention of Richard's orders.

Later years
Garnier is last mentioned in connection with the engagement of Betenoble on 12 June 1192, during which he punished a brother of the Order, Robert of Bruges, for attacking the enemy without his order. Garnier of Nablus died in the second half of 1192, probably on August 31. The first mention of his successor Geoffroy de Donjon is in January 1193.

Popular culture
In the video game Assassin's Creed (2007), Garnier de Naplouse (the game uses the French Naplouse instead of Nablus) is one of the nine main assassination targets and is depicted as a man taking in mentally ill patients, often by force, and experimenting on them in an attempt to cure them. While being somewhat successful, this in-game version of Garnier is portrayed as cruel and sadistic, greatly contrasting with his real life persona. In addition, he is depicted as a secret member of the Knights Templar and is killed in Acre in 1191, when historically he died in 1192 after fighting in the Battle of Arsuf (which in the game takes place a few months after Garnier's assassination).

Actor Donald Sumpter portrays Garnier de Nablus in the 2008 BBC TV docudrama series Heroes and Villains, which features a reenactment of the Battle of Arsuf.

See also

 Cartulaire général de l'Ordre des Hospitaliers
 List of Knights Hospitaller sites
 Langue (Knights Hospitaller)
 Flags of the Knights Hospitaller

References

Bibliography

External links
Garnier de Naplouse. French Wikipedia.
Liste des grands maîtres de l'ordre de Saint-Jean de Jérusalem. French Wikipedia.
Eugène Harot, Essai d’armorial des Grands-Maîtres de l’Ordre de Saint Jean de Jérusalem.
Seals of the Grand Masters. Museum of the Order of St John.
Charles Moeller, Hospitallers of St. John of Jerusalem. Catholic Encyclopedia (1910). 7. New York: Robert Appleton Company.

Grand Masters of the Knights Hospitaller
Knights Hospitaller
Christians of the Third Crusade
1192 deaths
Priors of Saint John of Jerusalem in England
1147 births